G. Philip Robertson is an American biologist who is currently the University Distinguished Professor
of Ecosystem Science at Michigan State University.

References

Year of birth missing (living people)
Living people
Michigan State University faculty
Hampshire College alumni
Indiana University alumni
21st-century American biologists